Kirklevington is a neighborhood in southeastern in Lexington, Kentucky, United States. Its boundaries are West Hickman Creek to the west, New Circle Road to the north, Tates Creek Road to the east, and Wilson Downing Road to the south.

Neighborhood statistics
 Population: 6,697
 Land area: 
 Population density: 8,477
 Median household income: $30,746

Neighborhoods in Lexington, Kentucky